Xenopterella is a genus of flies in the family Lauxaniidae. There are at least two described species in Xenopterella.

Species
These two species belong to the genus Xenopterella:
Xenopterella beameri Steyskal, 1965
Xenopterella obliqua Malloch, 1926

References

Further reading

 

Lauxaniidae
Articles created by Qbugbot
Lauxanioidea genera
Diptera of North America